Dinah Hawken (born 1943) is a New Zealand poet, creative writing teacher, physiotherapist, counsellor and social worker.

Life and career
Hawken was born in Hāwera in 1943 and is a trained physiotherapist, psychotherapist and social worker. She worked at Victoria University of Wellington as a student counsellor for two decades, and has taught creative writing at the International Institute of Modern Letters.

Her first collection, It Has No Sound and Is Blue, was published in 1987, and won her the Commonwealth Poetry Prize for Best First Time Published Poet that year. It was largely written while she was living in New York City, where she worked as a social worker while studying for a Master of Fine Arts in Creative Writing at Brooklyn College with John Ashbery. The key poem, "Writing Home", is modelled on the "Jerusalem Sonnets" of James K. Baxter but from a feminist perspective. Harry Ricketts, writing for the Oxford Companion to New Zealand Literature, considers that she is also influenced by Wallace Stevens and Adrienne Rich. Her next collection, Small Stories of Devotion (1991, published in the United Kingdom in 1995) and established Hawken's reputation as one of several successful women poets who emerged in the 1980s. 

In 2007 she received the Lauris Edmond Award for Distinguished Contribution to Poetry. In 2008 she wrote seven poems to accompany a performance by the New Zealand String Quartet of The Seven Last Words of Christ by Joseph Haydn. Many of her works feature themes of nature, spirituality and the experiences of women, and her poetry is often written in a prose-like form.

Selected works
 It Has No Sound and Is Blue (1987)
 Small Stories of Devotion (1991, United Kingdom edition published in 1995)
 Water, Leaves, Stones (1995)
 The Little Book of Bitching (1998)
 Where We Say We Are (2000)
 Oh There You Are Tui! (2001) 
 One Shapely Thing: Poems and journals (2006)
 The Leaf-Ride (2011)
 There Is No Harbour (2019)
 Sea-Light (2021)

References

External links
 Profile on Read NZ Te Pou Muramura website
 Author page at the New Zealand Electronic Poetry Centre

1943 births
Living people
People from Hāwera
20th-century New Zealand poets
21st-century New Zealand poets
20th-century New Zealand women writers
21st-century New Zealand women writers
New Zealand women poets
New Zealand physiotherapists
New Zealand social workers
20th-century New Zealand educators
21st-century New Zealand educators
Academic staff of the Victoria University of Wellington
Brooklyn College alumni